Lucy Marie Walsh (born December 3, 1982) is an American actress, singer, songwriter, and pianist. She is also known for her television and film roles. She is the daughter of Eagles' guitarist Joe Walsh and his third wife, Juanita "Jody" Boyer.

Personal life
Walsh has been married to Will Sweeny since May 2021. He is the son of  ghost hunter Yvette Fielding.

Musical career

Lucy is also a classically trained pianist and a professional singer and songwriter. She grew up in a musical family, her father is Joe Walsh of the band Eagles (she was named “Favorite Rockstar Daughter” by CBS News, her uncle (by marriage) is Ringo Starr of The Beatles, and her grandmother was a pianist for the New York City Ballet. When Lucy's dad was awarded the Kennedy Center Honor by President Barack Obama and First Lady Michelle Obama, she attended the White House by his side. Signed to Island Def Jam by Jay-Z and L.A. Reid, Lucy has toured internationally with her music, most recently with Maroon 5, OneRepublic and Bruno Mars.

She has performed on National Television with MTV's hit series Rock the Cradle, earning the highest judge's score of the season. Judge Larry Rudolph said that "the hairs on his arms were standing up after hearing her. She received a "Perfect 10 from Rudolph for her performance of Don Henley's "The Heart of the Matter". Fellow judge Brian Friedman said, "Lucy was untouchable... magical, I was in her soul."

Lucy has sung the National Anthem at numerous events, including Dodger Stadium, UCLA’S Angel City Games hosted by Mayor Eric Garcetti, and for President Bill Clinton, Maria Schriver, and Tiger Woods. Lucy has been featured on numerous artists albums, including Secondhand Serenade and Roy Orbison’s Under The Sheets tribute record. Her music has been recorded by multiple recording artists, in several languages,
and her original songs have over 1 million plays online.

Podcast
Lucy has a bi-weekly podcast with her friend Annabel Jones (daughter of Monkee Davy Jones) called The Lucy and Annabel show. They discuss their childhoods and current happenings in their life. The podcast airs every other weekend. It can be found on YouTube, itunes and Spotify.

Acting career
Her debut Shakespearean performance as Ariel in The Tempest, won her a Broadway World nomination for Best Actress.

She has gone on to play Shakespeare’s most famous heroines, including;
 Cleopatra in Antony and Cleopatra 
"Beatrice" in Much Ado About Nothing, which won Best Director (Gloria Gifford) at the NAACP Theatre Awards 2018
Adriana in Comedy Of Errors, for which she won Best Ensemble in the Valley Theatre Awards with her cast.

Lucy's additional theatre credits include: 
Joyce Carol Oates drama I Stand Before You Naked
Oscar Nominated comedy icons Renee Taylor and Joe Bologna’s comedy Love Allways
 Stephen Adly Guirguis’s The Motherfu**er With The Hat
Down On Your Knees and Up To The Moon, an a cappella musical she co-wrote with the show's New York director Gloria Gifford.

Known for her role on the 9th season of Curb Your Enthusiasm opposite Elizabeth Banks and Larry David, Walsh has also recently appeared on Criminal Minds playing the head cop and directed by the shows Tony winning star Joe Mantegna. Lucy has also Guest Starred on NCIS and her feature films include the horror hit No Solicitors opposite Eric Roberts, and Garry Marshall’s final film Mother's Day  opposite Jason Sudeikis. Lucy also has her original song "Winter Coat" included in the film, during Julia Roberts iconic throwback to "Pretty Woman" scene.

Discography

Singles

Albums
Lucy Walsh [unreleased – 2005]
Lost in the Lights [unreleased – 2008]
1882 [released to iTunes – 2011]

Filmography

Theatre
 The Tempest (2014 – as Ariel)
 Comedy Of Errors (2015 – as Adriana)
 Much Ado About Nothing (2016 – as Beatrice)
 Antony and Cleopatra (2017 – as Cleopatra)

References

External links
Official website
Imdb profile
Lucy Walsh on MySpace
Fansite

1982 births
Living people
Actresses from Santa Barbara, California
Musicians from Santa Barbara, California
Singing talent show contestants
Singers from California
21st-century American singers
21st-century American women singers